The 1948 Roller Hockey World Cup was the fourth roller hockey world cup, organized by the Fédération Internationale de Patinage a Roulettes (now under the name of Fédération Internationale de Roller Sports). It was contested by 9 national teams (8 from Europe and 1 from Africa) and it is also considered the 1948 European Roller Hockey Championship (despite the presence of Egypt) and the 1948 Montreux Nations Cup. All the games were played in the city of Montreux, in Switzerland, the chosen city to host the World Cup.

Results

Standings

See also
FIRS Roller Hockey World Cup
CERH European Roller Hockey Championship
Montreux Nations Cup

External links
1948 World Cup in rink-hockey.net historical database

Roller Hockey World Cup
International roller hockey competitions hosted by Switzerland
1948 in Swiss sport
1948 in roller hockey